The toy bulldog is an extinct unrecognized breed of small bulldog that existed in England during the 18th and early 19th centuries.

The same name is used for unrelated, but similar-appearing dogs, that are mostly modern crosses between bulldogs and pugs, which are also not a recognized dog breed.

Original attempts
Early dog breeders worked in two different directions, to decrease the weight to a desirable 20 pounds or so and create a new toy bulldog breed:
 One method was to downsize the bulldog by selecting smaller individuals for breeding. This was not very successful, due to medical complications with breeding below normal-sized dogs. Natural dwarf bulldog puppies are occasionally borne by normal-sized parents, but they were neither the healthiest, nor the most fertile dogs, and their own puppies were often regular-sized dogs. Thus, this version of the breed was never established. 
 An alternate attempt at creating a toy bulldog was via crossbreeding French bulldogs with standard bulldogs or with the crossed offspring. Several dogs were presented as breed candidates by "The French Toy Bulldog Club of England" to the Kennel Club. English breeders and Kennel Club representatives refused to call a mixed-breed dog a "bulldog", and this variety of dog has also not developed to the point of a recognized breed.

The breeding programs were dropped and the line of dogs bred from these early attempts died out.

Modern dogs
Nowadays, the term toy bulldog is occasionally used to describe a small variety of another cross also called a miniature bulldog. They are not an established breed, but rather a hybrid produced by crossbreeding bulldogs with pugs or the crossed offspring.
They come in a variety of different colors ranging from pale yellow, light fawn to solid red.

Temperament
Modern toy bulldogs are stubborn and hard to train. They also do not socialize and cannot live together with other dogs that have been introduced to them as mature dogs. Toy bulldogs do not need much care and love being indoors along with afternoon naps.

References

Extinct dog breeds
Toy dogs
Bulldog breeds
Dog breeds originating in the United Kingdom